Om Prakash Sharma (1933/4 – 16 January 2021) was an Indian politician, who had served as Member of Legislative Council in Uttar Pradesh from 1972 until he was defeated in 2020. He was the president of Uttar Pradesh Madhyamik Shikshak Sangh. He died of dysentery on 16 January 2021. He was also appointed the Pro tem Chairman of the UP upper house by Uttar Pradesh Governor Ram Naik in 2016.

See also 
 Uttar Pradesh Legislative Council

References 

1930s births
2021 deaths
Members of the Uttar Pradesh Legislative Council
Uttar Pradesh politicians
Deaths from dysentery